Time to Depart is a 1995 historical mystery crime novel by Lindsey Davis and the seventh book of the Marcus Didius Falco Mysteries series.  Set in Rome during AD 72, the novel stars Marcus Didius Falco, an informer and imperial agent. The title refers to the law which stated that no Roman citizen who had been sentenced to death might be arrested, even after the verdict, until he has been given time to depart, the idea being that for a Roman citizen to choose exile outside the boundaries of the Empire would have been a fate worse than death itself.

Plot summary
Falco's closest friend, Petronius Longus, has finally caught one of the leading criminals in Rome, Balbinus Pius.  But a quirk in Roman law allows a convicted felon, even a murderer, time to depart before the sentence is carried out.  Balbinus' departure has left a vacuum in the underworld of Rome, and there is a crowd of criminals trying desperately to fill the void.  Their first step is to engineer a robbery that reverberates throughout the city.

Falco is again called upon by the Emperor Vespasian to supply answers, as quietly and quickly as possible.  A couple of murders, a kidnapping or two, and more suspects than Falco cares to count takes him, and his patrician girlfriend Helena Justina, to places a family shouldn't have to go.

Characters in Time to Depart

High Society 
 Anacrites - Imperial spy
 Camillus Aelianus - Eldest son of Decimus Camillus Verus
 Camillus Justinus - Youngest son of Decimus Camillus Verus
 Decimus Camillus Verus - Senator and father of Helena Justina
 Helena Justina - Daughter of the Senator Decimus Camillus Verus
 Julia Justa - Wife of Camillus Verus and mother of Helena
 T. Claudius Laeta - Imperial clerk
 Titus Caesar - Eldest son of the Emperor
 Vespasian - Emperor

Low Society (Fountain Court) 
 Cassius - Baker
 Castus - Junk-dealer
 Ennianus - Basket-weaver
 Lenia - Laundress
 Marcus Didius Falco - Informer and Imperial Agent from the Aventine.
 Smaractus - Landlord

Law and Order 
 Arica - Member of the Sixth Cohort
 Arria Silvia - Wife of L. Petronius Longus
 Fusculus - Member of Petronius' enquiry team
 L. Petronius Longus - Enquiry chief in the XIII region and friend of Falco
 Marcus Rubella - Tribune of the Fourth Cohort of vigiles
 Martinus - Deputy
 Porcius - Recruit
 Scythax - Doctor
 Sergius - Punishment officer
 Tibullinus - Centurion of the Sixth Cohort

Other Citizens 
 Alexander - Doctor
 Balbinus Pius - Crime boss
 Flaccida - Wife of Balbinus
 Florius - Husband of Milvia
 Lalage - Proprietress of the Bower of Venus
 Little Icarus - Member of Balbinus' Gang
 Macra - Employed at the Bower of Venus
 Milvia - Daughter of Balbinus
 Nonnius Albius - Court witness
 The Miller - Member of Balbinus' Gang

Major themes
 Investigation into the underworld of Roman life,
 Developing relationship of Marcus Didius Falco and Helena Justina.

Allusions/references to actual history, geography and current science
 Set in Rome in AD 72, during the reign of Emperor Vespasian.

Release details
 1995, UK, Century Hardback (out of print)
 1996, UK, Arrow, Paperback 
 1997, UK, Chivers Press, Large Print, 
 1997, US, Mysterious Press, Hardback 
 1998, US, Mysterious Press, Paperback 
 2003, UK, Arrow, Paperback  (as part of single-volume omnibus edition, Falco on the Loose, with Last Act in Palmyra and A Dying Light in Corduba)

References

External links
lindseydavis.co.uk/  Author's Official Website

1995 British novels
Marcus Didius Falco novels
Historical novels
72
Century (imprint) books